Sirius Software was a video game publisher of Apple II, Atari 8-bit family, Commodore 64, and VIC-20 games in the early 1980s. Sirius also developed games for the Atari 2600 which were published by 20th Century Fox Video Games.

History 

The company was founded in the early 1980s by Jerry Jewell and Terry Bradley. It gained attention for its dramatically quick rise to prominence and its equally quick collapse in 1984 after 20th Century Fox (Fox Video Games) failed to pay over USD$18 Million in owed royalties.  Sirius Software designed and marketed more than 160 computer video games, software products and hardware devices worldwide.  Jewell was profiled by author Steven Levy in his book Hackers.

Sirius' quick rise was due in part to a chain of hits by programmer Nasir Gebelli.  Gebelli's breakthrough game was Gorgon, which brought the gameplay of the arcade's Defender to the Apple II.  His technical ability and Jewell's sales and marketing skills combined to create in a single year a multimillion-dollar enterprise operating out of a rented apartment. By June 1982 the game had sold 23,000 copies, making it one of the best-selling computer games at the time. By early 1984 InfoWorld estimated that Sirius was the world's 15th-largest microcomputer-software company, with $11 million in 1983 sales.

Sirius also published a line of graphical adventure games in an attempt to compete with Sierra On-Line, but without much success.  Most of the company's games were launched on the Apple II line of computers, but they also released some titles for other platforms, notably the Atari 8-bit and Commodore 64.

The Smithsonian Museum produced a "living history" video of Jewell's role in the early personal computer industry.

Games

References 

Defunct video game companies of the United States
Software companies based in California
Companies based in Sacramento, California
Defunct software companies of the United States
Defunct companies based in California
Video game companies established in 1980
Video game companies disestablished in 1984
1980 establishments in California
1984 disestablishments in California